Alnitak is a triple star system in the constellation of Orion. It has the designations ζ Orionis, which is Latinised to Zeta Orionis and abbreviated Zeta Ori or ζ Ori, and 50 Orionis, abbreviated 50 Ori. The system is located at a distance of several hundred parsecs from the Sun and is one of the three main stars of Orion's Belt along with Alnilam and Mintaka.

The primary star, Alnitak Aa, is a hot blue supergiant with an absolute magnitude of −6.0 and is the brightest class O star in the night sky with a visual magnitude of +2.0. It has two companions—Ab and B, the latter known for the longest time and the former discovered recently, producing a combined magnitude for the trio of +1.77. The stars are members of the Orion OB1 association and the  association.

Observational history

Alnitak has been known since antiquity and, as a component of Orion's Belt, has been of widespread cultural significance. It was reported to be a double star by amateur German astronomer George K. Kunowsky in 1819. Much more recently, in 1998, the bright primary was found by a team from the Lowell Observatory to have a close companion; this had been suspected from observations made with the Narrabri Stellar Intensity Interferometer in the 1970s.

The stellar parallax derived from observations by the Hipparcos satellite imply a distance around 225 parsecs, but this does not take into account distortions caused by the multiple nature of the system and larger distances have been derived by many authors.

Stellar system

Alnitak is a triple star system at the eastern end of Orion's Belt, the second-magnitude primary having a 4th-magnitude companion nearly 3 arcseconds distant, in an orbit taking over 1,500 years.

The part called Alnitak A is itself a close binary, comprising the stars Alnitak Aa and Alnitak Ab.

Alnitak Aa is a blue supergiant of spectral type O9.5Iab with an absolute magnitude of −6.0 and an apparent magnitude of 2.0. It is estimated as being up to 33 times as massive as the Sun and a diameter 20 times greater. It is some 21,000 times brighter than the Sun, with a surface brightness (luminance) some 500 times greater. It is the brightest star of class O in the night sky.

Alnitak Ab is a blue subgiant of spectral type B1IV with an absolute magnitude of −3.9 and an apparent magnitude of 4.3, discovered in 1998.

A fourth star, 9th-magnitude Alnitak C, has not been confirmed to be part of the Aa–Ab–B group, and may simply lie along the line of sight.

The Alnitak system is bathed in the nebulosity of IC 434.

Etymology and cultural significance
ζ Orionis (Latinised as Zeta Orionis) is the star system's Bayer designation and 50 Orionis its Flamsteed designation.

The traditional name Alnitak, alternately spelled Al Nitak or Alnitah, is taken from the Arabic النطاق an-niṭāq, "the girdle". In 2016, the International Astronomical Union organized a Working Group on Star Names (WGSN) to catalog and standardize proper names for stars. The WGSN's first bulletin of July 2016 included a table of the first two batches of names approved by the WGSN; which included Alnitak for the star ζ Orionis Aa. It is now so entered in the IAU Catalog of Star Names.

Orion's Belt

The three belt stars were collectively known by many names in many cultures. Arabic terms include النجاد Al Nijād 'the Belt', النسك Al Nasak 'the Line', العلقات Al Alkāt 'the Golden Grains or Nuts' and, in modern Arabic, ميزان الحق Al Mīzān al Ḥaqq 'the Scale of Justice'. In Chinese mythology they were known as The Weighing Beam.

The belt was also the Three Stars mansion, one of the twenty-eight mansions of the Chinese constellations. It is one of the western mansions of the White Tiger.

It is one of the western mansions of the White Tiger.

Namesakes
The USS Alnitah was a U.S. Navy Crater-class cargo ship named after the star.

See also
 Flame Nebula

References

External links
 
 
 

O-type supergiants
B-type giants
Triple star systems

Orion (constellation)
Orionis, Zeta
1948 9
BD-02 1338
Orionis, 50
037742
026727
Orionis, 126
Alnitak
Stars named from the Arabic language